The Armenian Catholic Patriarchal Exarchate of Jerusalem and Amman (colloquially Jerusalem of the Armenians) is the missionary pre-diocesan jurisdiction of the Armenian Catholic Church sui iuris (Eastern Catholic, Armenian Rite in Armenian language) in the Holy Land (Palestine/Israel) and (Trans)Jordan.

It is directly dependent on the Armenian Catholic Patriarch of Cilicia, not part of his or any ecclesiastical province.

Its Cathedral episcopal see is a World Heritage Site: the Church of Our Lady of Sorrows, Jerusalem.

Antecedents 
Previously the area had the lower status of patriarchal vicariate within the Armenian Catholic Patriarch of Cilicia's proper archdiocese (based in Beirut).

Patriarchal Vicars of Jerusalem
 Monsignor Giovanni Gamasargan (1973 – 1978)
 Father Joseph Chadarevian (1978 – 1986)
 Father Joseph I. Debs (1986 – 1991 see below)

History 
 Established on 1 October 1991 as Patriarchal Exarchate of Jerusalem.
 In 1998 demoted as Territory Dependent on the Patriarch of Amman and Jerusalem, under the same Ordinary
 Promoted back in 2001 as Patriarchal Exarchate of Jerusalem and Amman

Ordinaries 
(all Armenian Rite)

Patriarchal Exarchs of Jerusalem
 Father Joseph I. Debs (see above 1991 – 1992), previously last Patriarchal Vicar of Jerusalem of the Armenians (1986 – 1991)
 Archimandrite Joseph Rubian (1992 – 1995)
 André Bedoglouyan, Patriarchal Clergy Institute of Bzommar (I.C.P.B.) (1995 – 1998 see below), previously Titular Bishop of Comana Armeniæ (1971.07.24 – death 2010.04.13) & Auxiliary Eparch of Cilicia of the Armenians (patriarchate, in Lebanon) (1971.07.24 – 1994.11.05), also Apostolic Administrator of Kameshli of the Armenians (Syria) (1988 – 1989)

Protosyncellus of (Patriarchal Dependency) Amman and Jerusalem
 André Bedoglouyan, I.C.P.B. (see above 1998 – retired 2001)

Patriarchal Exarchs of Jerusalem and Amman 
 Kévork Khazoumian (2001 – 2006.03.15), also Titular Bishop of Marasc of the Armenians (2002.01.22 – 2006.03.15); later Coadjutor Archeparch of Istanbul of the Armenians (Turkey) (2006.03.15 – 2014.05.21)
 Msgr. Raphaël François Minassian (2006 – 2011.06.24); later Titular Archbishop of Cesarea in Cappadocia of the Armenians (2011.06.24 – 2021.09.23), Ordinary of East Europe of the Armenians (Armenia) (2011.06.24 – 2021.09.23) & Catholicos Patriarch of Cilicia of Armenian Catholics as Raphaël Bedros XXI Minassian (2021.09.23 – ...)
 Msgr. Joseph Antoine Kélékian (2011.08.08 – retired 2014)
Apostolic Administrator Msgr. Kevork Noradouguian (Dankayé) (2014.04.30 – 2015.11.25) (no other office)
 Kricor-Okosdinos Coussa (2015.11.25 – 2019.05.10); previously Eparch of Iskanderiya of the Armenians (Alexandria, Egypt) ([2003.09.09] 2004.01.07 – ...)
  (2019.05.10 – 2022)
  (2022 – ...)

References

External links 
 GCatholic with incumbent biography links
Catholic-hierarchy.org

Jerusalem
Jerusalem
Jerusalem
Catholic Patriarchal Exarchate
Eastern Catholicism in Israel
Eastern Catholicism in Jordan
Eastern Catholicism in the State of Palestine